BSEE may stand for:

 Bachelor of Science in Electrical Engineering, an undergraduate degree
 Bureau of Safety and Environmental Enforcement, an agency of the U.S. Department of Interior